Belvidere Community Unit School District 100 (BCUSD 100) is a unified school district located in Belvidere, the county seat of Boone County, Illinois. The school district is composed of twelve schools in all, with all schools being located in or near the city limits of Belvidere, with the exception of Caledonia Elementary School in Caledonia, Illinois. There are six elementary schools, two middle schools, two high schools, and one alternative program. The current superintendent is Dr. Daniel Woestman. The district's office is at 1201, 5th Avenue in Belvidere, Illinois (61008).

In 2018, 2019, and 2020 the district was recognized as a certified Great Place to Work.

The district provides grades PreK-12, in the facilities listed below.

Caledonia Elementary School (PreK-5) [2311, Randolph St, Caledonia, Ilinois]

Lincoln Elementary School (K-5)  [1011, Bonus Ave, Belvidere, Illinois]

Meehan Elementary School (K-5) [1401, E Sixth St, Belvidere, Illinois]

Perry Elementary School (K-5) []

Seth Whitman Elementary School (K-5) []

Washington Academy (PreK-5) []

Belvidere Central Middle School (6-8) []

Belvidere South Middle School (6-8) []

Belvidere High School (9-12) []

Belvidere North High School (9-12) []

Everest Alternative Program (9-12) []

Academic Performance

The academic performance of the school district is at or just below the state average.

References

External links
 

Belvidere, Illinois
Education in Boone County, Illinois
School districts in Illinois